3,4-Methylenedioxy-N-propargylamphetamine (MDPL) is a lesser-known psychedelic drug and a substituted amphetamine. MDPL was first synthesized by Alexander Shulgin. In his book PiHKAL (Phenethylamines i Have Known And Loved), the minimum dosage is listed as 150 mg, and the duration unknown. MDPL causes few to no effects. Very little data exists about the pharmacological properties, metabolism, and toxicity of MDPL.

Legality

United Kingdom
This substance is a Class A drug in the Drugs controlled by the UK Misuse of Drugs Act.

See also 

 Phenethylamine
 Psychedelics, dissociatives and deliriants

References 

Substituted amphetamines
Benzodioxoles
Propargyl compounds